Insulin dependent diabetes mellitus 3 is a protein that in humans is encoded by the IDDM3 gene.

References